is a Japanese manga anthology written and illustrated by Amayo Tsuge. It is licensed in North America by Digital Manga Publishing, which released the manga through its Juné imprint, on December 12, 2007.

Reception
Leroy Douresseaux, writing for Comic Book Bin, felt the manga is "gentle, playful, and funny". Julie Rosato, writing for Mania, felt Tsuge's artistic strength was in drawing "cute faces", despite there being "only two faces in this artist's repertoire". Rosato summed it up as being at best "no more than a fluff read". Holly Ellingwood, writing for Active Anime, describes the anthology as "cute and mostly comedic stories that see all types of fun and light hearted yaoi romances everywhere".

References

External links
 

Comedy anime and manga
Manga anthologies
2006 manga
Yaoi anime and manga
Houbunsha manga
Digital Manga Publishing titles